The Fiddle Concerto is an album by Mark O'Connor. It contains two pieces written by O'Connor, the first of which is a violin concerto in American fiddle style, commissioned by the Santa Fe Symphony and premiered in 1993. The second piece is a string quartet for violin, viola, cello, and double bass commissioned by the Santa Fe Chamber Music Festival in 1990.

Track listing
All music was written by Mark O'Connor.
"The Fiddle Concerto: I" – 13:07
"The Fiddle Concerto: Cadenza" – 4:53
"The Fiddle Concerto: II" – 12:58
"The Fiddle Concerto: III" – 5:45
"The Fiddle Concerto: Cadenza" – 8:26
"Quartet for Violin, Viola, Cello, and Doublebass: I" – 6:40
"Quartet for Violin, Viola, Cello, and Doublebass: II" – 8:21
"Quartet for Violin, Viola, Cello, and Doublebass: III" – 7:51
"Quartet for Violin, Viola, Cello, and Doublebass: IV" – 7:17

Personnel
Mark O'Connor - Violin
Daniel Phillips - Viola
Carter Brey - Cello
Edgar Meyer - Double bass
The Concordia Orchestra
Marin Alsop - Conductor
also
Mark O'Connor - Producer
Craig Miller - Executive Producer
Marc Aubort - Recording Engineer

References

Mark O'Connor albums
1995 albums
Warner Records albums